Portland, Illinois may refer to the old name of:
 Blue Island, Illinois in Cook County
 Oglesby, Illinois in LaSalle County

Portland is also the name of a township in Whiteside County.